Vithagan is a 2011 Tamil-language action film directed by R. Parthiban that features himself in the lead along with Poorna. The film, which has been in making since 2008, released on 18 November 2011. The film was the 50th film of Parthipan, has him in the role of a police officer, who is brainy as well as brawny. With an innovative tagline 'With the gun', 'Vithagan' has Poorna as heroine and music has been composed by Joshua Sridhar of 'Kadhal' fame. The film opened to extremely negative reviews and bombed at the box office.

Plot

Rowdran (R. Parthiban) is an upright cop who is fighting not only the scums of the society but also his seniors who are hand-in-glove with the goondas. For this, he takes law into his hands and goes on an unstoppable killing spree wiping out the wanted criminals in police files, one by one in carefully planned operations.

But soon, the film goes from a legitimate thriller to a typical revenge drama without much warning. In a flashback, we are told that our orphan cop had a picture-perfect family which was wiped out by Badri (Milind Soman). And now to bring the don back from a foreign destination and take revenge, Rowdran who is put behind bars turns a goonda and joins Sena (another don) and takes on Badri.

Cast
R. Parthiban as ACP Rowdhran
Poorna as Mercy
Milind Soman as Badri
Vincent Asokan
L. Raja
M. J. Shriram
Lakshmi Ramakrishnan
Sampath Ram
 Krishnamoorthy
Singamuthu
Mahanadhi Shankar
Raaki Parthiban (Special appearance)

Production
Two years after his last venture Pachchak Kuthira bombed at the box office, Parthiban commenced his next directorial titled as Vithagan in 2008, while also playing the lead role in the film - that of an intelligent assistant commissioner who is "crooked and cunning at the same time". He added that he would have two different looks in the film. Poorna was selected to portray the female lead as a Christian girl named Mercy. Hindi character actor Milind Soman, who was last seen in Paiyaa was finalized for the main antagonist role. In October 2010, reports claimed that director-producer Gautham Vasudev Menon would provide his voice for Milind Soman. Parthiban's son Radhakrishnan (Raaki) would appear in a one-minute cameo role during a song sequence. Vadivelu was supposedly considered for a comedy role in the film, which did not materialize eventually. While Joshua Sridhar was roped in to compose the film's score, M. S. Prabhu was signed as the cinematographer and Nalini Sriram as the costume designer. A bungalow set was constructed in an 18-storey building in Chennai as well as a helipad where the climax fight sequence was to be filmed. Parts of the film were shot in Vienna, Austria and the Czech Republic.

Soundtrack
Soundtrack was composed by Joshua Sridhar and lyrics for all songs written by Parthiban.
Gappu Aappu - Benny Dayal
Ikkuthe - Hariharan, Shreya Ghoshal
Thanana - Swetha Mohan
Un Zone La - Sayanora Philips, Suchitra
Kadalirandu - Chinmayi
Vegamaai - Benny Dayal, Sunitha Sarathy

Critical reception
Rohit Ramachandran of Nowrunning rated it 1.5/5 stating that "The experience feels like chewing on coarse, indigestible cud."
Pavithra Srinivasan of rediff rated it 1.5/5 stating that "Vithgan is a silly movie."

References

External links
Vithagan Movie Review

2011 films
2010s Tamil-language films
Fictional portrayals of the Tamil Nadu Police
Films shot in Vienna
Films shot in the Czech Republic
Films scored by Joshua Sridhar
V